The Church of Saint Joseph and Saint Maximilian Kolbe, popularly known as Iglesia de los Conventuales (due to its history as a former claustration convent), is a Roman Catholic parish church in Montevideo, Uruguay.

History
The temple and its convent were built by French architect Víctor Rabú between 1860 and 1867 for the Order of the Visitation of Holy Mary, whose nuns lived in claustration. The architectural inspiration, mix of Renaissance and Baroque, was taken from the Italian Basilica of Sant'Andrea, Mantua.

For some time the remains of the patriot priest Dámaso Antonio Larrañaga were held here, before being brought to the cathedral.

The parish was established much later, on 17 February 1966.

Today it is held by the Conventual Franciscans. It is dedicated to Saint Joseph; later it was also dedicated to the Polish martyr St. Maximilian Kolbe, O.F.M. Conv.

References

External links
 Pictures of "Conventuales"

Barrio Sur, Montevideo
1966 establishments in Uruguay
Roman Catholic churches completed in 1867
Roman Catholic church buildings in Montevideo
Franciscan churches in Uruguay
Baroque Revival architecture in Uruguay
19th-century Roman Catholic church buildings in Uruguay